Hibiscus striatus, the striped hibiscus or striped rosemallow, is a plant in the mallow family, Malvaceae. Its flowers are 5 inches across, some of the largest flowers of any mallow plant.

References 

striatus
Plants described in 1787
Taxa named by Antonio José Cavanilles